The L Taraval is a hybrid light rail/streetcar line of the Muni Metro system in San Francisco, California, mainly serving the Parkside District. Since 2021, the line has been suspended and replaced by buses through the end of 2024 for an improvement project along Taraval Street.

Route description
The line begins at Wawona and 46th Avenue station (near the San Francisco Zoo), which is on a one-way loop on Vicente Street, 47th Avenue, Wawona Street, and 46th Avenue. It runs north on 46th Avenue to Taraval Street, then runs east on Taraval Street to 15th Avenue. The line then runs south one block on 15th Avenue, then east on Ulloa Street to West Portal station, where it tags along with the other Muni Metro lines towards Embarcadero.

Operation 
Prior to the COVID-19 pandemic, the L Taraval operated seven days a week, with train service beginning at 5 a.m. weekdays, 6 a.m. Saturdays, and 8 a.m. Sundays. Trains ran until 12:30 a.m, with daytime headways between 6 and 9 minutes.

Service is provided by overnight Owl buses during the hours that rail service is not running. The L Owl bus serves the full length of the route, as well as along The Embarcadero to Fisherman's Wharf. (The Embarcadero section was added on June 15, 2019, to provide Owl service along the F Market & Wharves route.)

History

In June 1908, United Railroads (URR) subsidiary Parkside Transit Company laid a single-track line that ran on 20th Avenue from an existing line on H Street (now Lincoln Way) to Wawona Street, then on Wawona one block to 19th Avenue. A connecting shuttle line running from 20th Avenue on Taraval Street, 33rd Avenue, Vicente Street, and 35th Avenue to Sloat Boulevard (meeting the 12 Ocean line) was opened by 1910. This trackage, which saw irregular passenger service, formed a barrier to the continued expansion of the city-owned Municipal Railway into the Parkside district. On November 25, 1918, the city and the private URR signed the "Parkside Agreements", which allowed Muni streetcars to use URR trackage on Taraval Street and on Ocean Avenue in exchange for a cash payment and shared maintenance costs.

Muni's L Taraval line opened as a shuttle between West Portal and 33rd Avenue (on rebuilt URR trackage west of 20th Avenue) on April 12, 1919. Tracks were was extended along Taraval to 48th Avenue at Ocean Beach by January 14, 1923 and on October 15, the shuttle service was replaced with larger streetcars running through to the Ferry Building. The URR discontinued their service on the line in late 1927. 

The L Taraval was extended south (turning off Taraval at 46th) to the San Francisco Zoo, the line's current outer terminus, on September 15, 1937, leaving a two-block spur line on Taraval, that is used occasionally for temporary storage. 

Over the next decade, the line's eastern terminus changed a few times. On January 15, 1939, every other streetcar was routed to the new Transbay Terminal. On January 1, 1941, cars were rerouted back to the Ferry Building. The Transbay Terminal became the inner terminal for all streetcars on June 6, 1948.

By 1950, many streetcar lines in the city were converted to buses after World War II, the L Taraval remained a streetcar line due to its use of the Twin Peaks Tunnel.

The L was partially converted to modern light rail operation as part of the opening of the Muni Metro system in 1980.

L Taraval Improvement Project

For its first 100 years in operation, the L Taraval operated similar to a bus, with rail vehicles receiving no priority over any other vehicle, obeying all stop signs, and stopping frequently when requested or when flagged down by passengers waiting at marked stops on the sidewalk. Because the rails were laid in the center of a four-lane roadway, passengers boarding or exiting must cross an active traffic lane. Often drivers would not stop for crossing passengers, leading to many being hit and injured getting off and on the L Taraval over the decades.

Starting in the early 2010s, Muni began proposing major changes to the L Taraval corridor to increase pedestrian safety and speed up trains, which would prove to be controversial.

The plan, eventually named the L Taraval Improvement Project, would dedicate the center lanes to rail vehicles, consolidate stops, and where stops remain, add traffic islands between the transit-only lane and the general traffic lane, giving passengers a protected area to exit or wait for the L Taraval. The project would also replace many of the stop signs along the route with traffic signals with transit priority, add additional traffic calming measures like curb extensions, replace the worn rails and overhead wire, along with sewer and water line replacements.

The plan was controversial because adding traffic islands would require the removal of street parking along Taraval, worrying nearby merchants, who feared less parking would reduce traffic in their businesses. The loss of parking along Taraval would be offset by moving parking spaces and meters to side streets and by converting side streets to angled parking to increase density. Seniors and some disability advocates were opposed to the removal of stops, because it would require longer walks for some passengers. Other disability advocates supported the project because it would add wheelchair ramps at additional stops.

Under pressure from these groups, Muni agreed to a pilot project in 2016 to see if better street markings, would get more drivers to stop for crossing passengers. The pilot program was unsuccessful, showing only a two percent increase in drivers stopping behind the L Taraval.

The final plan would add traffic islands at Taraval and 19th, 26th, 30th, 32nd, 40th, 42nd, 44th, and 46th (westbound only), along with an extension of the existing islands at Sunset and 22nd/23rd Avenues. The stops to be removed were at Taraval and 17th (westbound), 22nd (westbound), 24th (eastbound), 28th and 35th, along with Ulloa and 15th. These closures took place in 2017 and 2018.

Construction began in August 2019, beginning with the replacement of underground utilities. Construction on 'Segment A' of the project, between Sunset Boulevard and 46th Avenue, began in September 2019. This first phase was originally scheduled for completion in summer 2020, but work was not completed until July 2021. Bus substitution was scheduled to start for train service covering a superset of the Segment A (from the Zoo to Sunset) in Spring 2020. As part of Segment A work, the original track extending west on Taraval past 46th was replaced, but in a nod to history, the granite "Belgian blocks" were saved and re-set next to the new tracks, this stretch of tracks is the only left in San Francisco that used the blocks to buffer the track from the pavement . 

Construction on 'Segment B' of the project, between West Portal and Sunset Boulevard, began in January 2022. Segment B work is expected to last through 2024. On July 7, 2022, the L Bus was shortened to West Portal station and frequency was increased. Additional bus service to downtown, operating weekday middays on 50-minute headways, was added on October 10, 2022.

Station listing

References

External links

SFMTA - L Taraval Bus

Muni Metro lines
1919 establishments in California